Õru Parish was a rural municipality in Valga County, Estonia.

Settlements
Small borough
Õru
Villages
Killinge - Kiviküla - Lota - Mustumetsa - Õlatu - Õruste - Priipalu - Uniküla

References